Verbascum olympicum, the Greek mullein, Olympian mullein or Olympic mullein, is a species of flowering plant in the family Scrophulariaceae, native to northwest Turkey. A short-lived perennial reaching , the Royal Horticultural Society considers it a good plant to attract pollinators.

References

olympicum
Endemic flora of Turkey
Plants described in 1844